Dino Nicolás Delmastro (born 21 February 1996) is an Argentine badminton player. He competed at the 2018 South American Games. As civil engineering student at the National University of Comahue, he competed at the 2015 Summer Universiade in Gwangju, South Korea.

Achievements

BWF International Challenge/Series 
Men's singles

Men's doubles

  BWF International Challenge tournament
  BWF International Series tournament
  BWF Future Series tournament

References

External links 
 

Living people
1996 births
Sportspeople from Bariloche
Argentine male badminton players
Competitors at the 2018 South American Games
20th-century Argentine people
21st-century Argentine people